The Srpska Open Challenger is a tennis tournament held each September in Banja Luka, Republika Srpska, Bosnia and Herzegovina since 2002. The event is part of the ATP Challenger Tour and is played on outdoor clay courts.

Past finals

Singles

Doubles

External links 
 
ATP search

 
ATP Challenger Tour
Clay court tennis tournaments
Tennis tournaments in Bosnia and Herzegovina
Sport in Banja Luka
Autumn events in Bosnia and Herzegovina